Tiexi District, Siping is a district of Siping City, Jilin, People's Republic of China.

Administrative Divisions
Subdistricts:
Renxing Subdistrict, Yingxiong Subdistrict, Dizhi Subdistrict, Zhanqian Subdistrict, Beigou Subdistrict

Townships:
Tiaozihe Township, Pingxi Township

References

External links

County-level divisions of Jilin